is a district located in Ibaraki Prefecture, Japan.

As of 2003, the district has an estimated population of 122,478 and a density of 284 persons per km2. The total area is 431.44 km2.

Towns and villages
Ibaraki
Ōarai
Shirosato

Mergers
 On October 16, 2004 the town of Ōmiya absorbed the villages of Miwa and Ogawa, all from Naka District; the town of Yamagata, and the village of Gozenyama, in order to turn the town into the current city of Hitachiōmiya.
 On February 1, 2005 the town of Jōhoku, and village of Katsura merged with the village of Nanakai, from Nishiibaraki District, to form the new town of Shirosato.
 Also on February 1, 2005 the town of Uchihara merged into the city of Mito.
 On March 20, 2006 the towns of Ogawa and Minori merged with the village of Tamari, from Niihari District, to form the new city of Omitama.
 On December 8, 2007 the town of Ibaraki was scheduled to merge into the city of Mito, but those plans were abandoned.

Districts in Ibaraki Prefecture